"Why Georgia" is the third single released by John Mayer from his first album, Room for Squares. As a B-side, the international version single featured the live version of "Why Georgia" as it appeared on Mayer's first live album, Any Given Thursday, as the single followed the live album's release. The international single was released only four and a half months prior to Mayer's second album, Heavier Things.

Lyrics
The song is autobiographic, and touches on Mayer's experience of having a "quarterlife crisis", a phenomenon of 20-somethings.  He moved to Atlanta with Clay Cook after dropping out of Berklee College of Music, and, though pursuing his dreams, had doubts if he would be successful or not. In one interview he said 
I remember getting into some pretty dismal places money-wise and opportunity-wise. I kind of looked at my guitar and said, 'It's just you and me. I'll go where you take me.' He expresses this feeling in the song's refrain:

'Cause I wonder sometimesAbout the outcomeOf a still verdictless lifeAm I living it right?

Response
Rolling Stone magazine said that the song "lifts into a melodic chorus you won't soon forget". Stylus magazine praised "Why Georgia," saying of the single, "pure pop guitar lines resonate." PopMatters bemoaned that on songs like "Why Georgia", Mayer sounds just like Dave Matthews.

Track listing
All songs by John Mayer unless otherwise indicated.

US version
 "Why Georgia" – 4:28
 "3x5" (Live at the X Lounge) – 5:18
 "No Such Thing" (Demo Version) (John Mayer & Clay Cook) – 3:51

International version
 "Why Georgia" – 4:28
 "3x5" (Live at the X Lounge)(feat. Brad Paisley) – 5:18
 "No Such Thing" (Demo Version) (Mayer & Cook) – 3:51
 "Why Georgia" (Any Given Thursday version) – 6:51

Personnel
John Mayer — vocals, guitar
David LaBruyere — bass
Nir Z — drums, loops
Brandon Bush — Hammond organ
John Alagia — percussion
Clay Cook — backing vocals
Doug Derryberry — backing vocals

Cover versions 
In 2004, saxophonist Gerald Albright covered the song from the album "Kickin' It Up".

Charts

Certifications

References

External links
 
John Mayer plays "Why Georgia" live in New York for MSN.com.

2001 songs
2003 singles
John Mayer songs
Songs written by John Mayer
Columbia Records singles
Songs about Georgia (U.S. state)